Cyanothamnus acanthocladus is a plant in the citrus family, Rutaceae and is endemic to a small area in the south-west of Western Australia. It is a low, prickly shrub with small leaves and white, four-petalled flowers.

Description
Flowering occurs in September.

Taxonomy and naming
This species was first formally described in 1998 by Paul G. Wilson and given the name Boronia acanthoclada in Nuytsia from a specimen collected in the Frank Hann National Park. In a 2013 paper in the journal Taxon Marco Duretto and others changed the name to Cyanothamnus acanthocladus on the basis of cladistic analysis. The specific epithet (acanthocladus) is derived from latinized Greek, acantho- meaning 'spiny' and cladus 'a branch'.

Distribution and habitat
Cyanothamnus acanthocladus grows in sand over gravel and is only known from the type collection.

Conservation
Cyanothamnus acanthocladus (as Boronia acanthoclada) is classified as "Priority Two" by the Western Australian Government Department of Parks and Wildlife meaning that it is poorly known and from only one or a few locations.

References

acanthocladus
Flora of Western Australia
Plants described in 1998
Taxa named by Paul G. Wilson